Fatjon Fatmir Sefa (born 23 July 1984) is an Albanian professional footballer who plays as a forward for Lushnja in Albanian Superliga. He is nicknamed "Ujku" (Wolf for Albanian) due to his scoring abilities inside of the zone.

Club career

Dinamo Tirana
Sefa moved to Dinamo Tirana in the summer of 2008 ahead of the club's Champions League campaign of 2008–09. He moved from his hometown club, Lushnja and was given the number 16 shirt for his first season. He played the first leg of Dinamo Tirana's Champions League encounter against FK Modrica. He came on in the 53rd minute for Argentine, Cristian Andres Campozano.

Sefa made his league debut in a Dinamo Tirana jersey on the opening day of the season against Teuta Durrës. He came on in the 76th minute for fellow new signing, Frane Petricevic. He scored his first goal for the club on 1 November 2008 against Apolonia Fier. Sefa opened the score in the 14th minute and also played the full game.

He also managed to score a hat-trick against Apolonia Fier on 15 February 2009, his goals came in the 45th, 62nd and 74th minute of the game, after completing his hat-trick he substituted for Rubén Cecco in the 85th minute. During the 2008–09 season he played 24 games and scored 9 goals, making him the club's second highest goalscorer for the season. During his time at the capital club, he created a fierce partnership with Elis Bakaj.

Besa Kavajë
In July 2012, Sefa joined top flight side Besa Kavajë by signing a contract for the upcoming season.

Skënderbeu Korçë
In May 2014, following the relegation of Besa Kavajë in Albanian First Division, Sefa joined Albanian champions Skënderbeu Korçë by signing a one-year contract.

He made his competitive debut with the team in the opening Albanian Superliga week against the newly promoted side Elbasani at Qemal Stafa Stadium, scoring the only goal of the match in the first half. After winning the Albanian Supercup and the Albanian Superliga title with the club, Sefa left Skënderbeu Korçë at the end of the 2014–15 season through a mutual agreement to terminate his contract, which was due to expire the following year in 2016.

Third return to Lushnja

In August 2015, Sefa returned to his hometown club Lushnja for the third time in his career, taking the vacant number 29 and was given the Captaincy. On 14 May 2017, Sefa scored the only goal in the final match against Bylis Ballsh to help Lushnja finish top of Group B, helping the club to return to Albanian Superliga for the first time in three years.

Sefa made his first top flight appearance in two years on 10 September in Lushnja's first match of the season against Vllaznia Shkodër. He opened his scoring account on matchday 6 against his ex side Skënderbeu Korçë, scoring the temporary equalizer with a header in an eventual 4–1 away defeat. Sefa was on the scoresheet two weeks later where he scored a last-minute goal to help Lushnja clinch their first league victory.

Later on 9 December, Sefa scored a brace against reigning champions Kukësi, including a shot outside the zone, to give his team a 3–1 win at Zeqir Ymeri Stadium; the first away win of the season and the first in six matches.

Career statistics

Honours

Club
Dinamo Tirana
Albanian Superliga: 2009–10
Albanian Cup: Runner-up 2009–10

Skënderbeu Korçë
Albanian Supercup: 2014
Albanian Superliga: 2014–15

References

External links
Profile at FSHF.org
ESPN profile

1984 births
Living people
Sportspeople from Lushnjë
Albanian footballers
Association football forwards
KS Lushnja players
KS Shkumbini Peqin players
FK Dinamo Tirana players
Besa Kavajë players
KF Skënderbeu Korçë players
Kategoria Superiore players
Kategoria e Parë players